Monte Vista is a northern suburb of Cape Town, South Africa, whose name meaning 'Mountain View' is derived from Table Mountain being clearly visible from it. It is bordered by Edgemead, Welgelegen, Plattekloof Glen, and Goodwood.

Monte Vista Primary School was built in the 1960s.

References

Suburbs of Cape Town